Stephen James Phillips  (born 9 March 1970) is a British Conservative Party politician, barrister and recorder (part-time Crown Court judge). He represented the constituency of Sleaford and North Hykeham as its Member of Parliament (MP) from 2010 until his resignation on 4 November 2016, when he announced that he was standing down with immediate effect owing to his irreconcilable policy differences with the government.

Early life and education
Stephen Phillips was born in London on 9 March 1970, the son of Stewart Charles Phillips, a civil servant, and his wife Janice Frances née Woodhall. 
He attended St. Mary's and Hardye's School prior to attending Canford School, Dorset, for A Levels, attending Oriel College, Oxford, from 1988 to 1992, where he graduated with a BA degree (proceeding MA [Oxon]) in Jurisprudence (Law) in 1991; he pursued postgraduate studies at Oxford University, receiving a Bachelor of Civil Law (BCL) in 1992.

After studying to become a barrister at the Inns of Court School of Law, he was called to the Bar at Lincoln's Inn in 1993. He took silk (QC), and since 2009 has also served as a recorder. He was chairman of the governing body of Frank Barnes School, one of the few sign-bilingual schools for deaf people in Britain.

Phillips served a short commission in the British Army, as a Welsh Guards officer. In 2008, he contested a by-election for Hampstead Town ward (where he lives) on Camden London Borough Council, that had been triggered by the resignation of the Conservative incumbent, but lost to the Liberal Democrats.

Parliamentary career
Phillips entered the House of Commons in 2010 as Member of Parliament for Sleaford and North Hykeham, being its second parliamentary representative since the constituency was created, following Douglas Hogg.

Phillips sat on the European Scrutiny Committee, the Public Accounts Committee and the committee for the Defamation Bill.
He showed "his anger and disappointment" with Lin Homer, head of HMRC, who he said had allowed HSBC to get away "scot free" with large-scale tax avoidance.
He attracted criticism from some for spending around 1,700 hours annually working as a barrister whilst serving as an MP. Phillips described his own parliamentary attendance record as "excellent", asserting that his outside work "doesn’t affect the way in which I perform as an MP", and accused his critics of "envy" over his yearly £750,000 earnings from his legal work.

In November 2016, he resigned as a Conservative MP, saying that he had "irreconcilable policy differences" with the government of Theresa May. Phillips had previously said that he believed the government was becoming more right-wing, and that its attempts to begin negotiations to leave the EU without consulting Parliament were "divisive and plain wrong". Formally, he was appointed Steward and Bailiff of the Manor of Northstead in North Yorkshire.

Personal life
From 1998 to 2013, Phillips was married to Fiona  Goldsby, a barrister and QC. Together they have three children. He divides his time between London and his home in Lincolnshire.

See also 
 Courts of England and Wales
 Public Accounts Committee (United Kingdom)

References

External links
 Stephen Phillips campaign
 Official Biography on Conservative Party website

 Barrister at 7 Kings Bench Walk Chambers

1970 births
Living people
People from Chiswick
English people of Welsh descent
Welsh Guards officers
Alumni of Oriel College, Oxford
English King's Counsel
Members of Lincoln's Inn
Conservative Party (UK) MPs for English constituencies
Lawyers from London
21st-century English judges
21st-century King's Counsel
UK MPs 2010–2015
UK MPs 2015–2017
People educated at Hardye's School
Politicians from London